Jimmy Logan (1928–2001) was a Scottish actor and comedian.

Jim Logan may also refer to:

Jim Logan (American football) (1916–2004), American football player
Jim Logan (Australian footballer) (1911–1999), Australian rules footballer
Jimmy Logan (footballer) (1893–1968), Scottish footballer

See also
James Logan (disambiguation), a disambiguation page for "James Logan"